Colonel General Amangeldy Shabdarbayev (Amangeldı Smağūlūly Şabdarbaev; born on 1 August 1950 in Kaskelen district, Almaty Province, Kazakhstan) served as the Chairman of the National Security Committee (KNB) from 2 March 2006 to 7 December 2009. He replaced Nartai Dutbayev, and was himself replaced by Adil Shayakhmetov. He graduated from the Kazakh Institute of Physical Training and KGB Higher School of the USSR in Moscow, USSR with a degree in law.

Career
Shabdarbayev served in the Military of the Soviet Union in 1974.

He joined the State Security Committee of the Kazakh SSR in 1976. He retired from the committee in 1986 after the Zheltoqsan riot. He then served as Deputy Chief of the "Kazneftedorstroy" trust.

He became the Deputy Chairman of the State Investigation Committee in November 1995, and the Head of “A” Service of the KNB in 1997. He previously served as the Head of the Presidential Security Service from January 2002 until Kazakh President Nursultan Nazarbayev promoted him to the head of the KNB on 2 March 2006.

He has received many awards, including the "Dangq" order II, from the Commonwealth of Independent States.

Deutsche Welle reported on 3 March that "according to politicians and political analysts, Shabdarbaev does not belong to any of the 'influence groups' between which an open confrontation began after the murder of Altynbek Sarsenbayev."

Arystan board
The administrative board of the service has been completely renewed. By the results of attestation more than 20 military officials of the special division have been dismissed without restoration right. The officer from executives reserve with experience of operative and personnel work has been appointed a new Arystan Chairman. Military discipline has been taken under rigid control."

Family
He is married and has four children.

References

1950 births
Kazakhstani politicians
Soviet military personnel
Living people
Directors of intelligence agencies